Elijah Riyong is a professional rugby league footballer who currently plays for the Port Moresby Vipers. He is a Papua New Guinea international and competed in the 2010 Four Nations. He made his test debut in 2009.

References

Living people
Papua New Guinean rugby league players
Papua New Guinea national rugby league team players
Port Moresby Vipers players
1988 births
Mendi Muruks players
Rugby league wingers